St. Louis Senior High School is a Ghanaian educational institution for girls in the Oduom suburb of Kumasi in the Ashanti Region.

History
Most Rev. Hubert Pailissen, SMA, in early 1949, said; "In this country, scarcely 15 percent of the school-going youth are girls. The people now begin to realize that more must be done in favour of this much–neglected part of the human race, and the chiefs, conscious of their duty towards their subjects, asked us to establish schools for girls in their respective villages…. But to obtain results, it is necessary that the direction of girls' schools should be in the hands of 'Sisters of a Teaching Order' with the necessary experience in the latest development of pedagogic methods."

Hence, on 18 October 1947, the first St. Louis Sisters arrived in the country. They were to continue the running of an already-established elementary school, the St. Bernadette School, now popularly called 'Roman Girls'. True to character, the St. Louis Sisters, who never do things by the halves, decided to establish a new secondary school on the same compound.

In 1952, St. Louis Secondary was opened, with an initial group of 12 girls. Only some out of this group survived to join the second group of 1953 to make 42. By December 1957, when the surviving group wrote their "O" Level Examination, they numbered 11.

Most of the salaries of the Sisters, funds raised, and Diocesan contributions went into developing the compound and acquiring necessary inputs.

The church wanted the Apostolate of Education to develop the essential task of forming strong and enlightened Christians, capable of exercising much influence in social and political affairs. Perhaps, there is no branch that needed more attention than female education.

Long before "Girl child" education became a popular slogan, the Catholic Church and St. Louis understood the depth of its importance. That is why the St. Louis Sisters and the Church always adopted an holistic approach to education.

Despite staffing and financial difficulties, the student population continued to grow. It was clear that further accommodation had to be provided. Through the kindness of Nana Osei Agyemang Prempeh II (the then Asantehene of blessed memory), the requisite site was given, and funds were provided by both the Diocese and the Sisters.

Succeeding reports of inspectors testified to the excellence of teaching given by the Sisters. These reports paid tribute to the school’s "air of efficiency" and its "very good organization and discipline". It was upon these commendations that the Ministry of Education, in 1960, wished the Sisters would open a Training College on the site on which St. Louis Secondary School now stands. That same year, 1960, a change-over took place, and St. Louis Secondary School moved to its present site. The foundation stone was laid by the late Otumfuo Osei Agyemang Prempeh II, Asantehene, on 25 March 1960 (the feast of Annunciation) and was blessed by Rt. Rev. Andrew van den Bronk (SMA), then Bishop of Kumasi.

In the same year, the Sixth Form Arts class began with five students. In 1964, the Administration Block was built and dedicated appropriately to the "Annunciation" (for we have good news to tell). More buildings were put up to meet the school's expanding needs. In 1964, the Sixth Form Science stream was started. Past students will recall the butterfly collection with Sister Elizabeth (Mary Roch) and Sr. Philomena McGuinness, (Mary Iosagan), the delightful training in Music and Singing that left such a rich tradition, as well as the insightful Drama performance. There was also the planting of shrubs, shade trees, and general landscaping with Sr. Aideen. Today, the school has many more buildings, including a library complex.

Community Outreach

To attend the shortage of missionary priests and nuns, the students formed a strong lay apostolate to go to the outlying compounds to teach Catechism, prepare candidates for Baptism, and visit lapsed Christians to re-awaken their faith. Students also got an opportunity to broaden their outlook by visiting neighbouring countries.

In the early 1970s the school began admitting boys into Sixth Form. This continued until the early 1980s when the program ended due to the problem of control.

Alliance
The school maintains an ongoing alliance with the Opoku Ware Senior High School, popularly called AkataSlopsa.

Notable alumni
 Elizabeth Adjei, diplomat
 Margaret Amoakohene, academic and diplomat
 Anne Amuzu, computer scientist and entrepreneur
 Patricia Appiagyei, politician
 Lydia Forson, actress, writer and producer
 Dzifa Gomashie, actress, producer, screen scriptwriter and politician
 Ruth Ama Gyan-Darkwa, academic prodigy
 Yvonne Nduom, business executive
 Afia Schwarzenegger, Ghanaian media personality

See also

 Education in Ghana
 List of senior high schools in the Ashanti Region
 Roman Catholicism in Ghana

References

External links
 , the school's official website

1952 establishments in Gold Coast (British colony)
Ashanti Region
Educational institutions established in 1952
Girls' schools in Ghana
High schools in Ghana
Public schools in Ghana
Catholic secondary schools in Ghana